Künsebeck is a railway station located in Künsebeck, Germany. The station is on the Osnabrück–Brackwede railway. The train services are operated by NordWestBahn.

Train services

The following services currently call at Künsebeck:

References 

Railway stations in North Rhine-Westphalia
Railway stations in Germany opened in 1889